Greased Lightning is a 1928 American silent Western film directed by Ray Taylor and written by William Berke and Gardner Bradford. The film stars Ted Wells, Betty Caldwell, Walter Shumway, Lon Poff, George Dunning and Myrtis Crinley. The film was released on July 29, 1928, by Universal Pictures.

Cast     
 Ted Wells as Johnny Parker
 Betty Caldwell as Diana Standish
 Walter Shumway as Dick Merrihew
 Lon Poff as Beauty Jones
 George Dunning as Mickey Murphy
 Myrtis Crinley as Annie Murphy
 Victor Allen as Jack Crane

References

External links
 

1928 films
1928 Western (genre) films
Universal Pictures films
Films directed by Ray Taylor
American black-and-white films
Silent American Western (genre) films
1920s English-language films
1920s American films